The 6th Foreign Engineer Regiment was a unit of the Foreign Legion in the French Army, part of the rapid reaction force and component of the 6th Light Armoured Division, (6e DLB). The 6th Foreign Engineer Regiment became the 1st Foreign Engineer Regiment (1e REG) in 1999.

Creation and names 
The 6th Foreign Engineer Regiment (6e REG) was created on July 1, 1984 at Laudun (Gard). The regiment was redesignated as the 1st Foreign Engineer Regiment on June 30, 1999 with the creation of the 2nd Foreign Engineer Regiment 2e REG. At creation, the 6th Foreign Engineer Regiment (6e REG) comprised a command, 3 combat companies, reconnaissance and support company (CCAS). On the eve of the regiment change to the 1st Foreign Engineer Regiment, 1er REG; the 6th Foreign Engineer Regiment already included:

Legion Pionniers Groups
 1st Amphibious Combat Company
 2nd Combat Company of Assault Mechanized Engineering
 3rd Combat Company of Aerotransportable Assault Engineering
 4th Combat Company was created in 1996
 The Combat Reconnaissance Company ( CA ) compromising heavy equipments
 The Command and Logistics Company ( CCs )
 DINOPS Teams of Nautical Subaquatic Intervention Operational Detachment specialized in Parachute, Underwater Demolition and Diving.

History -- garrison, campaigns and battles 
 Chad (Operation Epervier)
 Iraq (Opération Daguet). During the Gulf War, DINOPS operated in support of the U.S. Army's 82nd Airborne Division, and provided EOD services to the division. After the ceasefire they conducted a joint mine clearing operation alongside a Royal Australian Navy Clearance Diver Team Unit.
 Somalia (Operation Oryx)
 Cambodia (United Nations Transitional Authority in Cambodia) (Opérations Marquis 1 et 2)
 Former Yugoslavia - Sarajevo (UNPROFOR)
 Former Yugoslavia - Sarajevo/Rajlovac (IFOR)
 Kosovo (Kosovo Force)

Traditions 

The 6th Foreign Engineer Regiment (6e REG) inherits the traditions and battle honors of the 6th Foreign Infantry Regiment.

Insignias 

The insignia symbolizes the 6th Foreign Infantry Regiment in the form of a hexagon, the three Roman columns of the temple of Jupiter at Baalbek to the left of the insignia and the symbols of the French Foreign Legion: red and green colors with a grenade with seven flames in its center.

The specialty of the regiment is symbolized by the "pot en tête" (metal military helmet) and armor used by sergeants at arms in the 13th century and later worn by pionniers sapeurs. The number of the regiment is indicated in the grenade underneath the armor while the motto of the regiment is inscribed to the left and right of the hexagon.

Regimental colors

Regimental song 
Chant de Marche : Sapeurs, mineurs et bâtisseurs
1er couplet

Sixième étranger d’infanterie.
 Nous sommes tous les héritiers.
 Syrie, Liban et Tunisie
 Partout les combats sans pitié
 Par le sang versé
 Rendirent gloire.
 Au vieux régiment du levant.
 De nos anciens chantons la gloire
 Et reprenons d’un même élan.

Refrain
Sapeurs, mineurs et bâtisseurs
À l’assaut légionnaire du Six
Et de la force des vainqueurs
Portons très haut notre devise
Parfois détruire.
Souvent construire.
Toujours servir avec Honneur et Fidélité.

2e couplet

Sixième étranger de génie Légion,
Dans les combats les plus violents,
En première ligne nous serons mis,
Comme les Pionniers en défilant.
Et pour la gloire de la Légion
Nous remplirons avec ardeur,
Dans le respect des traditions

Notre mission de constructeurs.

Decorations 

 La Croix de guerre des théâtres d'opérations extérieures with 1 palm, the regiment for engagement in Kuwait in Opération Daguet, 1990.

Battle Honors 
Camerone 1863
Musseifre 1925
Syria 1925-1926
Kuwait 1990–1991

Regimental Commanders 

 1984 - 1985 : Colonel Degre
 1985 - 1987 : Colonel Boileau
 1987 - 1989 : Colonel Martial
 1989 - 1991 : Colonel Manet
 1991 - 1993 : Colonel Petersheim
 1993 - 1995 : Colonel Danigo
 1995 - 1997 : Colonel Hourbon
 1997 - 1999 : Colonel Ganascia

See also 

Major (France)
French Foreign Legion Music Band (MLE)

References

French engineer regiments
Regiments of the French Foreign Legion
Military units and formations established in 1984
Military units and formations disestablished in 1999
Military units and formations established in 1999
1999 establishments in France